Adrienne Danielle Frantz (born June 7, 1978) is an American actress and singer-songwriter. She appeared as Amber Moore in The Bold and the Beautiful (1997–2005, 2010–2012) and The Young and the Restless (2006–2010, 2013).

Career
Frantz was born in Mount Clemens, Michigan to Vicki and John Frantz. She first broke into the soap opera genre in 1997 as Tiffany Thorne on Sunset Beach. Frantz left the show later that year for her role as the villainess turned sympathetic heroine Amber on The Bold and the Beautiful. In 2001, her portrayal garnered Frantz a Daytime Emmy in the Outstanding Younger Actress category. Frantz played the role on B&B until 2005, when she left to focus on a music career. From November 2006 to May 2010, she played Amber on The Young and the Restless. July 1, 2010, marked Frantz's return to The Bold and the Beautiful as Amber, where she remained until 2012. Frantz made a one-episode appearance on The Young and the Restless in September 2013.

Outside of B&B, Frantz made a guest appearance as a popstar named Emica in the 2001 Rugrats episode, "All Growed Up", which later was the basis for the spinoff All Grown Up!. She played Claire Redfield in a commercial for Resident Evil 2, directed by George A. Romero, shown only in Japan. Frantz guest starred in an episode of That '70s Show, playing Fez's girlfriend Kelly.  Frantz later appeared in Ed Gein: The Butcher of Plainfield. In 2005, Frantz was cast in the horror film Hack!, which was released in 2007.

Personal life
In January 2010,  Frantz was engaged to actor Scott Bailey. Bailey and she married in California on November 11, 2011. In June 2015, Frantz announced that she was pregnant and gave birth to a girl, Amélie on December 1, 2015. In March 2020, Frantz announced that she was pregnant once again and gave birth to a boy, Lion on June 19, 2020. In November 2021, Frantz announced that she was pregnant once again and gave birth to a boy, Killian in March 2022.

Filmography

Discography
 2007 : Anomaly

References

External links

1978 births
Living people
American soap opera actresses
American television actresses
Actresses from Michigan
People from Mount Clemens, Michigan
Daytime Emmy Award winners
Daytime Emmy Award for Outstanding Younger Actress in a Drama Series winners
21st-century American women